American singer-songwriter JoJo has released five studio albums (one which is a Christmas album), two mixtapes, three extended play (EP), two re-recordings, twenty singles (including five as a featured artist), fifteen promotional singles and 34 music videos (including four unreleased). After JoJo competed on the television show America's Most Talented Kids she signed a seven-album record deal with Blackground Records in 2003 and released her eponymous debut album the following year at the age of 13.

In the United States, JoJo was released on June 22, 2004; which peaked at number four on the US Billboard 200, while charting into the top 40 on several other music markets. It was later certified platinum in the United States and has sold 1.3 million copies in the US. The album's lead single, "Leave (Get Out)", peaked at number twelve on the US Billboard Hot 100 and was later certified gold. The single peaked at number one on Billboard Mainstream Top 40 for five weeks making JoJo, at age 13, the youngest solo artist to ever have a number-one single on that chart. Internationally, the single charted within the top five in the UK and nine other countries. The album's second single "Baby It's You" featuring Bow Wow peaked at number 22 on the US Billboard Hot 100, while the album's final single "Not That Kinda Girl" was released internationally only. JoJo sold three million copies worldwide to date.

JoJo released her second studio album, The High Road, on October 17, 2006. The album peaked at number three on the Billboard 200 and was certified gold in the United States and has sold 538,000 copies. The album's lead single, "Too Little Too Late", became a top five hit on the Billboard Hot 100. The song broke Mariah Carey's record for the biggest jump into the top three entry on the chart when it moved from number 66 to number three. "Too Little Too Late" also reached the top ten in the UK and nine other countries. The album also generated the singles "How to Touch a Girl" and "Anything", the latter reached the top 40 of the UK Singles Chart for three weeks and charted on the Billboard Mainstream Top 40 at number 38. The High Road sold three million copies worldwide.

Record label disputes prevented JoJo from commercially releasing her third studio album, with All I Want Is Everything (2009) and Jumping Trains (2011) remaining unreleased, along with several others unnamed. JoJo's first mixtape, Can't Take That Away from Me, was released on September 7, 2010. It was preceded by the single "In The Dark". Standalone singles "Disaster" and "Demonstrate" were released during the interim. JoJo's second mixtape, Agápē, was released on December 20, 2012 and produced three singles, "We Get By", "André" and "Thinking Out Loud". Following her contractual release from Blackground, JoJo signed with Atlantic Records in December 2013 and released her extended play #LoveJo which included cover songs of Atlantic-affiliated artists Anita Baker and Phil Collins. JoJo's second EP III. was released on August 21, 2015, which produced the singles "When Love Hurts", "Say Love" and "Save My Soul". Her third EP #LoveJo2 was released on December 18, 2015.

JoJo's third studio album, Mad Love. was released on October 14, 2016, ten years after her last commercially released album and peaked at number six on the Billboard 200. The album's lead single, "Fuck Apologies", featuring Wiz Khalifa became a moderate success, charting on the U.S. Billboard Pop Digital Songs chart, peaking at number 40. It became JoJo's first charting single in the UK since 2007's "Anything" peaking at number 104 on the singles chart and number 18 on the UK R&B Singles Chart. "FAB." featuring Remy Ma served as the album's second single. On December 21, 2018, JoJo released re-recorded versions of JoJo and The High Road after the originals were removed from online platforms due to legal issues. To date She has sold more than six million albums worldwide.

Albums

Studio albums

Acoustic albums

Re-recordings
List of re-recorded studio albums

Mixtapes

Extended plays

Singles

As main artist

As featured artist

Promotional singles

Songwriting and other appearances

See also
 JoJo videography

Notes

References

Discography
Discographies of American artists
Pop music discographies
Rhythm and blues discographies